Retry may refer to:

 Retrial, in which a person is retried in court for various reasons
 Retry, another term for a single play-turn in a video game
 Retry (video game), a former 2014 video game developed by Rovio
 Part of the DOS error message, Abort, Retry, Fail?

See also 
 
 Try (disambiguation)